"Pero Ya No" (English: "But Not Anymore") is a song by Puerto Rican rapper Bad Bunny from his third studio album YHLQMDLG (2020). It was released on March 3, 2020, as the fifth single from the album. The song was solely written by Benito Martínez, Gabriel Mora, Jose Cruz, Freddy Montalvo and Jesus Prato and it was produced by Subelo NEO, EMG and Dex Wright.

Promotion and release
On February 28, 2020, Bad Bunny announced his third studio album that was revealed to be YHLQMDLG during his performance and guest appearance on The Tonight Show Starring Jimmy Fallon, which was released the following day.

Commercial performance
Following the releasing of its parent album, "Pero Ya No" charted at number 63 on the US Billboard Hot 100 dated March 14, 2020, becoming the sixth-highest charting track from YHLQMDLG as well as peaking at number 8 on the US Hot Latin Songs chart upon the issue date of March 14, 2020. In Spain, "Pero Ya No" reached at number 14.

Audio visualizer
A visualizer video for the song was uploaded to YouTube on February 29, 2020, along with the other visualizer videos of the songs that appeared on YHLQMDLG.

Music video
A music video for "Pero Ya No" was released on March 3, 2020 on YouTube.

Charts

Weekly charts

Year-end charts

References

External links
 
 

2020 songs
2020 singles
Bad Bunny songs
Songs written by Bad Bunny